Tito is an Egyptian action movie produced in 2004 starring Ahmed El Sakka, Hanan Tork, Amr Waked, Ashraf Dwedar, and Khaled Saleh. It was directed by Tarek Al Eryan. The movie is about a criminal who, as a young boy, didn't find anyone or anything to help or guide him, turning him into a vicious, yet kind hearted, criminal.

Cast 
 Ahmed El Sakka - Tito
 Hanan Tork - Nour
 Amr Waked - Faris
 Khaled Saleh - Refaat El Sokkary
 Ashraf Meselhy

External links
 

2004 films
2004 action films
2000s Arabic-language films
Egyptian action films